Gian Maria Rossi (Ravenna, born 19 November 1986) is an Italian professional footballer who plays as a goalkeeper for  club Imolese.

Club career
Born in Ravenna, Rossi started his career in local club Ravenna F.C. He made his professional debut in the 2006–07 Serie C1 season, this year Ravenna won the promotion to Serie B as a champion. The player made his Serie B debut on 9 February 2008 against Bologna. Rossi left the club at the end of 2011–2012 season.

Between 2012 and 2013, he played two seasons for Fidelis Andria on Serie C1.

In 2013 he joined Serie C2 club Bassano. He played four seasons for the club, three on Serie C.

On 11 November 2017, he moved to Imolese, on Serie D. Rossi extended his contract with the club in April 2019. On 12 September 2021 against Cesena, he played his 100 match for the club. He was named captain of the team.

Honours

Club 
Ravenna
 Serie C1: 2006–07 (C1/B)

Bassano Virtus
 Lega Pro Seconda Divisione: 2013–14 (Girone A)

References

External links
 
 

1986 births
Living people
Sportspeople from Ravenna
Italian footballers
Association football goalkeepers
Serie B players
Serie C players
Lega Pro Seconda Divisione players
Serie D players
Ravenna F.C. players
Alma Juventus Fano 1906 players
S.S. Fidelis Andria 1928 players
Bassano Virtus 55 S.T. players
Imolese Calcio 1919 players
Footballers from Emilia-Romagna